Ababu is both a given name and a surname. Notable people with the name include:

Josephat Ababu (born 1980), Kenyan cricketer
Ababu Namwamba (born 1975), Kenyan politician and lawyer

See also
Ababou
Ababuj